Fleurete's sportive lemur (Lepilemur fleuretae), or the Andohahela sportive lemur, is a sportive lemur endemic to Madagascar. The lemur was named after Fleurette Andriantsilavo, who was Secretary General of the Ministry of Environment, Water and Forestry in Madagascar.

References

Sportive lemurs
Endemic fauna of Madagascar
Mammals of Madagascar
Critically endangered fauna of Africa
Mammals described in 2006